is a French encyclopaedic collection of illustrated pocket books published by Éditions Gallimard since 1986. Books of this collection have been selectively translated into English. London-based publisher Thames & Hudson launched its first English-translated titles in 1992, under the title ‘New Horizons’ series. Harry N. Abrams of New York City produces the collection in United States under the title "Abrams Discoveries" series.

List of English-translated volumes 
 British version: 107 volumes;
 American version: 111 volumes.

 Two English version books originally published by Éditions Gallimard.

Découvertes Gallimard Hors série 
Two English version books from Découvertes Gallimard Hors série originally published by Éditions Gallimard.
 The Musée de l'Orangerie, translated from the French by John Adamson, 2006, .
 Élisabeth Vigée Le Brun - version anglaise, Geneviève Haroche-Bouzinac, 2016, .

Documentary adaptations of Découvertes Gallimard 

Production company: Trans Europe FilmRunning time: 52 minutes

Available in English-dubbed version:
 Numbers: The Universal Language, adaptation of the book of the same name by Denis Guedj, directed by Philippe Truffault, original French version released in 2001.
 Leonardo da Vinci: The Mind of the Renaissance, adaptation of the book of the same name by Alessandro Vezzosi, directed by Jean-Claude Lubtchansky, October 2004 (original French version released in 2001).

References

External links 
 List of books in "Abrams Discoveries" series at Goodreads
 List of books in 'New Horizons' series at Publishing History

Découvertes
List
French documentary films
French literature-related lists
Découvertes Gallimard

ar:اكتشافات غاليمار#قائمة الكتب
da:Découvertes Gallimard#Liste over bøger
el:Découvertes Gallimard#Κατάλογος βιβλίων
gan:發現之旅#正體中文譯本一覽
lt:Découvertes Gallimard#Knygų sąrašas
hu:Découvertes Gallimard#Könyvek listája
no:Découvertes Gallimard#Liste over bøker
pl:Découvertes Gallimard#Lista tomów tłumaczonych na język polski
zh-classical:發現之旅#中譯本一覽
wuu:發現之旅#簡體中文譯本列表